Hardberg is a hill in the Odenwald range in Hesse, Germany.

The Hardberg Transmission Tower is 135 metres high, weighs 130 tons and stands on an area of 12 * 12 metres.

Hills of Hesse